Grey Lynn is an inner suburb of Auckland, New Zealand, located  to the west of the city centre. Originally a separate borough, Grey Lynn amalgamated with Auckland City in 1914.

Grey Lynn is centred on Grey Lynn Park, which was not part of the original subdivision of 1883, since the land was too steep and too wet for house construction. In 1914 the land was drained and levelled for playing fields. The park is home to the annual Grey Lynn Park Festival, which attracts around 100,000 visitors on the third Saturday in November.

The character of the area is often seen as "arty", and one of being a "traditional home to free-thinkers and anti-establishment types".

Demographics

Grey Lynn had a population of 11,733 at the 2018 New Zealand census, an increase of 891 people (8.2%) since the 2013 census, and an increase of 1,491 people (14.6%) since the 2006 census. There were 4,173 households, comprising 5,751 males and 5,985 females, giving a sex ratio of 0.96 males per female, with 1,695 people (14.4%) aged under 15 years, 3,291 (28.0%) aged 15 to 29, 5,994 (51.1%) aged 30 to 64, and 753 (6.4%) aged 65 or older.

Ethnicities were 78.7% European/Pākehā, 9.7% Māori, 12.4% Pacific peoples, 9.8% Asian, and 3.4% other ethnicities. People may identify with more than one ethnicity.

The percentage of people born overseas was 29.6, compared with 27.1% nationally.

Although some people chose not to answer the census's question about religious affiliation, 60.5% had no religion, 28.2% were Christian, 0.5% had Māori religious beliefs, 1.6% were Hindu, 0.9% were Muslim, 1.0% were Buddhist and 2.7% had other religions.

Of those at least 15 years old, 4,884 (48.7%) people had a bachelor's or higher degree, and 564 (5.6%) people had no formal qualifications. 3,432 people (34.2%) earned over $70,000 compared to 17.2% nationally. The employment status of those at least 15 was that 6,591 (65.7%) people were employed full-time, 1,392 (13.9%) were part-time, and 318 (3.2%) were unemployed.

History

Grey Lynn takes the first part of its name from Sir George Grey (14 April 1812 – 19 September 1898), who served as Governor of South Australia, twice Governor of New Zealand, Governor of Cape Colony (part of what is now South Africa), Premier of New Zealand, and towards the end of his life, Member of Parliament for Auckland West. Grey's service as member of parliament for the area was apparently widely appreciated, since following his retirement from politics and death in 1898 the north-western portion of the suburb of Newton was renamed Grey Lynn in his honour.

Most of the houses were built between the 1880s and the beginning of the First World War of 1914–1918. Very few of the houses have been completely replaced by new structures.

Thomas Crummer owned Surrey Hills farm in the area, and left it to his children and his business partner, James Williamson. Williamson bought the Crummer's children's share in the land. In 1883, Williamson sold the property to the Auckland Agricultural Company. The Surrey Hills Estate was subdivided into 272 building sections to form the neighbourhood between Surrey Crescent and the southern end of Ponsonby Road. Two major roads in Grey Lynn, Williamson Avenue and Crummer Road are named after the two men. 

The developers largely laid out Grey Lynn's streets as straight roads (as opposed to the earlier farm roads such as Richmond Road, which twists and turns following the curve of the landscape). Several street-names echo the names of early landowners; Williamson, Crummer, Mckelvie, Pollen, and Prime. But there is a prevalence of cultural personages from Britain: Sir John Millais, Lord Elgin, Alfred Lord Leighton, Coleridge, the Earl of Beaconsfield, Dr Arnold, Dickens, and Dryden. This was obviously intended to give an artistic ambience to the area.

Most of the houses in the area were built between the 1880s and the beginning of the First World War. They were constructed quickly and with little variation in layout. Their façades were differentiated by the application of mass-produced items; wooden fretwork, stained-glass panels, turned balusters and pressed tin (intended for interior ceilings – this "new" product occasionally appears on the gable ends of some villas). The most important feature was the bay window—hence the name "Bay Villa"—an important feature which marked the owner as middle class. The new inhabitants tended to be younger married couples, employed in jobs such as clerks and office workers, teachers or skilled crafts-people. The adjacent area north of Richmond Road was probably similar. This was different from the nearby working-class area of Freeman's Bay or from the upper-middle-class area of Herne Bay.

By the 1930s and 1940s the original owners were beginning to age and the fussily detailed houses of Grey Lynn on their cramped sections were seen as very old-fashioned and undesirable. The increased ownership of motorcars meant suburban development was expanding exponentially, resulting in the mid-20th century ideal of the quarter-acre section. All the inner suburbs of Auckland became less desirable, and areas like Grey Lynn became very rundown. Many properties became owned by people who lived elsewhere and were often divided into flats or operated as boarding houses. Repairs were kept to a minimum and in some cases houses were not repainted for almost half a century. The fact that so many houses of this period still stand today despite the depredations of fire, rot and borer is an indication of how well they were built.

By the 1950s the very low rents in places like Grey Lynn and Ponsonby attracted students and immigrant workers from the Pacific Islands. By the 1960s Grey Lynn had developed a definite Polynesian flavour. Although in recent years this has greatly diminished, there are still a large number of Tongan and Samoan churches in the area.

The 1970s saw a renewed interest in older Victorian properties, and from that period onwards many young professionals began buying dilapidated kauri villas in areas like Grey Lynn and renovating them. On 3 December 1981 a landslide destroyed homes around Herringson Avenue and Shirley Road.

From the early 1990s this gentrification began to visibly change the area, resulting in an increase in house prices and in higher rents. Major corporate projects have gradually replaced lower-end retail enterprises.  An influx of middle-class people has resulted in a reduction of student flats and the slow but steady displacement of Polynesian families. A number of recent housing developments in the suburb have attracted controversy for their perceived contribution to the area's increasing population density.

Mayors (1885–1914)
Grey Lynn had a local government like other suburbs of Auckland at that time. The local government was called Grey Lynn Borough Council, which started in 1885 and in July 1914 merged into Auckland City Council.

Richard T. Warnock, 1885–1887
F. J. Jones, 1887–1888
S. J. Ambury, 1888–1890
Samuel Carey Brown, 1890–1893
Thomas English, 1893–1894
Richard T. Warnock, 1894–1896
John Wisdom Shackelford, 1896–1899
Richard T. Warnock, 1899–1903
John Wisdom Shackelford, 1903–1904
John Farrell, 1904–1907
George Sayers, 1907–1909
William John Holdsworth, 1909–1912
George Baildon, 1912–1914

Events

The Grey Lynn Park Festival has been held in early summer in Grey Lynn Park since 1984, and celebrated its 25th anniversary in 2009. It is the last independent community event in the city. The event, which attracts on average 100,000 visitors each year, is organised by four people who raise money from stall fees and charitable grants. It started as a local community get-together with working-class and Pasifika roots, though the appeal has broadened through the decades. Local band Unity Pacific first performed at the festival in 1987, and have appeared many times since. They headlined in 2009.

Education and sports

All these schools are coeducational. Rolls are as of 

Secondary schools serving the area include Auckland Girls' Grammar School, Mount Albert Grammar School, and Western Springs College.

Grey Lynn Park is the home ground of the Richmond Rovers rugby league club.

Transport
The suburb is served by public transport. It lies within walking distance of the central business district via Ponsonby. Buses run down Great North Road, Richmond Road, Surrey Crescent and Williamson Avenue.

Notable buildings

 Grey Lynn Fire Station: The former Borough Council Chambers and Fire Station. This building is distinguished by a wooden spire (recently restored) which originally housed the fire bell. Standing at the Ponsonby Road end of Williamson Avenue, this brick building dates from 1889, was designed by John Mitchell. It resembles many American fire stations of the period. The upstairs was used as the Borough Council Chamber until the suburb was amalgamated with Auckland City in 1914.
 Former Auckland Savings Bank: Located on Ponsonby Road near the intersection with Karangahape Road.  This italianate building was designed in 1885 by Edward Bartley – originally a single story building it received a second story designed by the same architect in 1900. The former banking chamber is distinguished by the use of New Zealand marble. In the 1920s the lower part of the room was lined with panelling made of Cloudy Bay Marble from Nelson.  Currently occupied by an Art Gallery.
 Allendale House: At the corner of Crummer Road and Ponsonby Road stands the large 1890s Italianate Mansion of George Allen, a saddle and harness maker. "Allendale" is a local landmark, having been successively a doctor's surgery, Maori girls hostel, boarding house, refuge for alcoholic men, and a restaurant. In the 1989 it was purchased by the ASB Community Trust as its headquarters and restored.
 Carlile House: A large Italianate building at 84 Richmond Road, designed by Robert Jones Roberts. Built in 1886 as an industrial school named the Costley Training Institute as part of the bequest of Edward Costley who left money for several Auckland charities. Owned by the adjacent church, it is now in poor condition and vandalised. The original stables are still visible on the Chamberlain Street side.
 Grey Lynn Public Library: Located at the Surrey Crescent shop at 474 Great North Road. This Neo-Georgian building was designed by architect William Gummer, and was opened in December 1924 by the then Mayor Sir James Gunson. It continues to be used as a public library and community hall today, and the inside now includes murals painted by artist Murray Grimsdale.
 Former Cameo Cinema: Located at the Surrey Crescent shops, built in 1928, this Art-Deco building has been subdivided into several spaces and is occupied by a variety of businesses. The arched entrance is still a feature of the streetscape facing down Great North Road towards Western Springs.
 St Joseph's Church: Located on the Great North Road at Surrey Crescent. This modernist Roman Catholic Church from 1958 was designed by Guy Chambers and is distinguished by stained glass windows by Milan Mrkusich. 
 St Joseph's Convent: Adjacent to the church on Great North Road is a school with modern buildings. One building is the former Convent built in the 1920s to replace an earlier wooden structure which burnt down.  It is currently used as a hostel.

References

Bibliography
The Heart of Colonial Auckland, 1865–1910. Terence Hodgson. Random Century NZ Ltd 1992.
Colonial Architecture In New Zealand. John Stacpoole. A.H & A.W Reed 1976
Decently And In Order, The Centennial History of the Auckland City Council. G.W.A Bush. Collins 1971.
Auckland Through A Victorian Lens. William Main. Millwood Press 1977.
Ponsonby Heritage Walks. Tania Mace. Ponsonby Road Productions 2005.
High hopes in hard times : a history of Grey Lynn and Westmere. Kaaren Hiyama. Media Studies Trust 1991.

External links

 Grey Lynn Online (business association website)
Grey Lynn Park Festival
Grey Lynn Residents Association website
Photographs of Grey Lynn held in Auckland Libraries' heritage collections.

Suburbs of Auckland
Waitematā Local Board Area